Hurricane deck or Hurricane Deck may refer to:
An upper deck, on certain types of ships
Hurricane Deck, Missouri, USA
Hurricane Deck Bridge, located nearby
Hurricane Deck (California), a ridge in California's San Rafael Wilderness